"Big Jack" is a song by Australian hard rock band AC/DC. It is the second single and the third track on the band's album, Black Ice. This song was number 53 on Rolling Stones list of the 100 Best Songs of 2008. The song was also featured in an episode of CSI: Miami entitled "Divorce Party". It is rumored the song was inspired by a man Angus hung out with in Memphis while on the Stiff Upper Lip tour.

It is also one of the songs from the album "Black Ice" that was played on the Black Ice World Tour that commenced in October 2008 and ended in June 2010.

Digital amplification methods

Malcolm Young has stated that he recorded his guitar part in the song (and the following track on the album, "Anything Goes") using Amplitube amp modeling software.

Track listing
Promo CD: 
"Big Jack" – 3:57

Personnel
Brian Johnson – lead vocals
Angus Young – lead guitar
Malcolm Young – rhythm guitar, backing vocals
Cliff Williams – bass guitar, backing vocals
Phil Rudd – drums, percussion

Chart performance

References

AC/DC songs
Songs written by Angus Young
Songs written by Malcolm Young
Song recordings produced by Brendan O'Brien (record producer)
2008 singles
2008 songs
Columbia Records singles